The Alco T6 (DL 440) was a diesel-electric locomotive of the switcher type rated at , that rode on two-axle trucks, having a B-B wheel arrangement.

The 'T' stood for 'Transfer', meaning this locomotive was capable of faster transition and higher sustained speeds than the regular 'S' - type yard switcher series.

Original Owners

Survivors 
The Delaware Coast Line Railway, the Ohio Central Railway and the Arkansas & Missouri operate the T-6. Ohio Central's T-6 is unique because it was the only one built (for Monongahela Connecting Railroad) with Hi-Ad trucks. 14 T-6's survive in all.

Pennsylvania RR 8427 survives as Georges Creek Railway 101. It was that railroad's first locomotive acquisition and is often used to switch the NewPage paper mill at Luke, Maryland.

Newburg and South Shore Railroad 1017 survives on the West Michigan Railroad.

Newburg and South Shore Railroad 1016 survives as Middletown and Hummelstown Railroad 1016.

Norfolk and Western Railway #40 survives as a static display in the Virginia Museum of Transportation. It has been restored to Chesapeake and Western #10 paint.

Norfolk and Western Railway #41 is operated by the Roanoke Chapter, NRHS. It has been restored to Norfolk and Western lettering and makes operating appearances at the Virginia Museum of Transportation.

See also 
 List of ALCO diesel locomotives
 List of MLW diesel locomotives

References

https://web.archive.org/web/20140220043646/http://www.gckrail.com/

External links
 Preserved diesels
 Sarberenyi, Robert. Alco T6 Original Owners.

B-B locomotives
T6
Diesel-electric locomotives of the United States
Railway locomotives introduced in 1958
Standard gauge locomotives of the United States
Standard gauge locomotives of Mexico
Diesel-electric locomotives of Mexico